The 2nd Parliament of Antigua and Barbuda was elected on Thursday, 1 November 1956, and was dissolved on Saturday, 29 October 1960.

It had its first meeting on 5 November 1956.

Members

Legislative Assembly

References 

Parliaments of Antigua and Barbuda